Wu Chin-yi (born March 4, 1968), better known as Annie Yi or Annie Shizuka Inoh, is a Taiwanese singer, actress, and writer.

Early life and education 
Wu Chin-yi was born on March 4, 1968, in Taipei, Taiwan, the youngest of seven daughters of Yang Shu-wan and Wu Min. Her mother is from Keelung and her father is from Shandong. Her father divorced her mother to married another woman who gave him a boy, her half-brother Wu Pu-hui.

During her childhood, she was sent to study in a primary school at Hong Kong to learn English. Then, she moved to Japan to live with her mother and her step-father 伊能祥光, a Japanese man from the Ryukyu Islands. She took her step-father's surname and took a Japanese name "Shizuka Inoh". She lived in Tokyo, Japan for six years and studied at Tokyo Chinese School.

After returning to Taiwan in 1988, she took the stage name "Yi Nengjing", by simplifying her Japanese name dropping the last character. In 2010, she was selected as a judge for the television series China's Got Talent.

Personal life 
On February 14, 2000, Yi married Taiwanese singer Harlem Yu in the United States. They had dated for 14 years. On March 20, 2009, the Yi and Yu officially issued a divorce statement, ending their eight-year marriage. From this marriage, Yi had a son Harrison Yu born on 16 March 2002 in the United States.

On March 21, 2015, Yi married Chinese actor Qin Hao in Phuket, Thailand. Yi gave birth to their daughter Cindy Qin in 2016 in the United States.

On 25 September 2013, Yi announced that she adopted Xia Junfeng's son Xia Jianqiang as her godson and his wife Zhang Jing as her blood sister.

Controversy 
In 2019, Annie Yi removed her social media post promoting the teachings of Indian godman Kalki Bhagwan after the Chinese Ministry of Public Security (MPS) and China Anti-Cult Association (CACA) issued a warning about the Oneness cult's activities in the state run media Global Times.

Filmography

Film

TV series

Television show(s)

References

External links

Annie's Internet Conservatory Official site (in Chinese)
Annie's Blog

1968 births
Living people
20th-century Taiwanese women singers
21st-century Taiwanese women singers
20th-century Taiwanese actresses
21st-century Taiwanese actresses
Taiwanese film actresses
Taiwanese television actresses
Actresses from Taipei
Taiwanese Mandopop singers
Cantopop singers
Japanese-language singers
Musicians from Taipei
Taiwanese women film directors
Film directors from Taipei
China's Got Talent
Taiwanese expatriates in Hong Kong
Taiwanese expatriates in Japan